ECPD may refer to:
Engineers' Council for Professional Development
El Cajon Police Department
European Cultivated Potato Database